The Brunswick nuclear power plant, named for Brunswick County, North Carolina, covers  at  above sea level about  from the Atlantic Ocean. The site is adjacent to the town of Southport, North Carolina, and to wetlands and woodlands, and was opened in 1975.

The site contains two General Electric boiling water reactors, which are cooled by water collected from the Cape Fear River and discharged into the Atlantic Ocean.

Duke Energy Progress is the majority owner (81.7%) and operator of the Brunswick nuclear plant.  The North Carolina Eastern Municipal Power Agency owns the remaining 18.3%. In 2015, Duke Energy completed the process of buying the North Carolina Eastern Municipal Power Agency's 18.3% stake at Brunswick nuclear power plant. (Duke Energy completed its merger with Progress Energy on July 2, 2012.)

The Brunswick plants' proximity to the Cape Fear River and the Atlantic Ocean allowed the designers to take in cooling water from the Cape Fear river and discharge it into the Atlantic off the coast of Oak Island. Fish, crustaceans, and other debris are removed from the cooling water via a filtration system. The water then flows through the nuclear plant and discharges into a five mile long canal which passes under the Intra-Coastal Waterway at one point.

Electricity Production

Surrounding population

The 2010 U.S. population within  of Brunswick was 36,413, an increase of 105.3 percent in a decade, according to an analysis of U.S. Census data for msnbc.com. The 2010 U.S. population within  was 468,953, an increase of 39.6 percent since 2000. Cities within 50 miles include Wilmington (18 miles to city center).

Seismic risk
The Nuclear Regulatory Commission's estimate of the risk each year of an earthquake intense enough to cause core damage to the reactor at Brunswick was 1 in 66,667, according to an NRC study published in August 2010.

Hurricane Florence
The two reactors at Brunswick were shut down on Thursday, September 13, 2018, prior to tropical storm-force winds from Hurricane Florence impacting the plant. Of the nine nuclear power plants in the path of Hurricane Florence, Brunswick was the only nuclear power plant shutdown.

References

External links 

 DoE Page
 Duke Energy Progress receives FERC Approval to Buy NCEMPA generation assets
 Photos

Energy infrastructure completed in 1975
Nuclear power stations using boiling water reactors
Buildings and structures in Brunswick County, North Carolina
Nuclear power plants in North Carolina
1975 establishments in North Carolina